Zleovo is a village in the municipality of Radoviš, North Macedonia. It used to be part of the former municipality of Podareš.

Demographics
According to the 2002 census, the village had a total of 928 inhabitants. Ethnic groups in the village include:

Macedonians 924
Serbs 3
Others 1

References

Villages in Radoviš Municipality